Mauléon-Licharre (Occitan: Maulion e Lisharra), or simply Mauléon, is a commune in the Pyrénées-Atlantiques department in southwestern France.

It is the capital of the Soule (Zuberoa) historical Basque province.

It is home to the canvas shoe, the  espadrille and etorki cheese.

Demographics

See also
Communes of the Pyrénées-Atlantiques department

References

External links

 MAULE-LEXTARRE in the Bernardo Estornés Lasa - Auñamendi Encyclopedia (Euskomedia Fundazioa) (in Spanish)
 Mauleon and the Medieval History of Navarre

Soule
Communes of Pyrénées-Atlantiques
Pyrénées-Atlantiques communes articles needing translation from French Wikipedia